Haut-Folin in the Saône-et-Loire department is at 901 m the highest point in the region of Burgundy in France. It is the summit of the Morvan mountain range.

It forms part of the drainage divide between the Seine and Loire rivers.

It is located in the commune of Saint-Prix.

There is a 40 km of cross-country skiing ski resort.

Landforms of Saône-et-Loire
Mountains of Bourgogne-Franche-Comté